Hepzibah is a fictional character appearing in American comic books published by Marvel Comics. She first appeared in The X-Men #107 (Oct. 1977) and was created by Dave Cockrum and Chris Claremont. She is a member of the intergalactic enforcers known as the Starjammers and was briefly a member of the Uncanny X-Men. The name of her species, Mephitisoid, is derived from the word Mephitidae, the scientific classification for skunks, which her species noticeably resembles.

Publication history
Dave Cockrum created the Starjammers with the intent of having them star in their own series. However, when he submitted the concept for Marvel's two try-out series, Marvel Spotlight and Marvel Premiere, he was repeatedly informed that these series were booked for two years solid. Cockrum showed the Starjammers to X-Men writer Chris Claremont, and convinced him to use the characters for this series. She first appeared in The X-Men #107 (Oct. 1977).

Fictional character biography

Origin
A member of the Mephitisoid species, Hepzibah was born on the planet Tryl'sart, while under Shi'ar Imperial Rule. Imprisoned by the authority of the then Shi'ar Emperor D'Ken, brother of Deathbird and Lilandra of the Royal House of Neramani, she first met Corsair (Christopher Summers) on the prison labor world Alisbar. Summers rescued her from a particularly gruesome death sentence (to be eaten alive at a banquet), prompting her to swear an eternal bond to him. The two met fellow prisoners Raza Longknife and Ch'od, and, after escaping Alzibar, the four of them formed the Starjammers. Summers, using the name "Corsair" in tribute to the science fiction adventurers he had admired during his youth, quickly earned the three aliens' respect and became the group's leader, eventually also winning the heart of Hepzibah, becoming her lover. It was Corsair who gave her the nickname "Hepzibah" (after the character of Miss Mam'selle Hepzibah from the comic strip Pogo), because her Mephitisoid name consists of a series of scents impossible to reproduce in spoken language.

Encounters with the X-Men
Hepzibah and the Starjammers teamed up with the X-Men on multiple occasions. The first time, the Starjammers came to the aid of the X-Men against D'Ken's Imperial Guard. Later, with the other Starjammers, she fought off an alien attack on the HMSS Starjammer starship. After that, she helped save Wolverine's life in outer space, and then engaged in mock combat with Carol Danvers. Hepzibah and the Starjammers helped the New Mutants neutralize the threat of the Magus.

Together with Ch'od, she sought the "map-rod" holding information on the location of the "Phalkon" power source. The Phalkon turned out to be the Phoenix. She and the Starjammers were attacked by Deathbird's Shi'ar starships. With the other Starjammers, she first met Excalibur on Earth and aided a rebellion against Deathbird on a Shi'ar border world.

Later, she was captured by Warskrulls and impersonated by one of them, until she was freed by the X-Men.

Other encounters
During the Kree/Shi'ar War, she battled Wonder Man and the Vision while escorting the Shi'ar nega-bomb to the Kree Empire. With Raza, she accepted an assignment from the former Kree admiral to kill the Black Knight. With the Starjammers, she visited the Avengers and Binary on Earth. She was thwarted in her attempt to poison the Black Knight, and the plan was foiled. She then returned with the Starjammers to the Shi'ar Empire.

Hepzibah also aided the Hulk in rescuing some of the Hulk's people from the alien forces of Troyjan. The Silver Surfer personally saved her life, an incident which led her to believe she simply intimidated the forces threatening her.

The Rise and Fall of The Shi'ar Empire
After Corsair reunited with his son Havok, and the Starjammers participated in a conflict between Lilandra's and D'Ken's forces, Corsair was killed by his own son Vulcan. Hepzibah raided the X-Men's stolen Shi'ar ship's weapons locker and was ready to take vengeance on Vulcan. However, she was forced to return with the repowered Professor X, Warpath, Darwin, and Nightcrawler when Lilandra, hoping to save her beloved Xavier from death and protect some of the X-Men (believing that the battle was not going well) locked the ship into a jump course for Earth. Consequently, Hepzibah, separated from her fellow Starjammers, is currently residing with the X-Men on Earth, with no foreseeable way to return to Shi'ar space to help the Starjammers and Lilandra continue to fight Vulcan.

Member of the X-Men
Since she is stuck on Earth and has nowhere else to go, Hepzibah joins Professor X's team of X-Men. She and Warpath have already created a bond of sorts, with Hepzibah remarking that his presence has helped her through her mourning of Corsair. Together, they confront one of the X-Mansion's guardian Sentinels when Caliban, a long time X-Men ally, runs onto the grounds.

She is seen in an altered standard X-Uniform and entering the Morlock Tunnels alongside Warpath, Storm, and Caliban. As a group, they are attempting to discover the reason for the Morlocks' increased activity, which has included the capturing of X-Men ward Leech. Hepzibah, as a furred female with enhanced senses, has multiple problems with the sewers. Hepzibah's name has been written on a Morlock wall, along with the names of the other X-Men team members.

Warpath and Hepzibah continue to try to track the Morlocks but the subterranean environment of the Morlock tunnels suddenly triggers Hepzibah's primal instincts, causing her to immediately go into heat as she is now newly single after the death of Corsair, her previous mate. She tells an astonished Warpath that her species "burrows to nest" and then tries to mate with him, but he refuses saying that it was neither the time nor place, as they were in the middle of a mission. They are then interrupted by a surprise attack of the very Morlocks they were attempting to track.

Later after the conflict with the Morlocks, she speaks with Cyclops at the X-Mansion, where he accepts her having chosen Warpath as her new mate.

World War Hulk
Hepzibah is one of the X-Men who answers the Stepford Cuckoos' call for help when the Hulk attacks Professor Xavier.

Messiah Complex
Hepzibah disables one of the giant robot O*N*E Sentinels after they become corrupted and attack the X-Mansion. She then becomes a member of the new incarnation of X-Force. After checking a Cooperstown Hospital for Cable, they track him to the Canadian wilderness where the team gets into a fight with the newly re-formed Reavers. When Caliban is killed, Warpath becomes overprotective of Hepzibah telling her this isn't her fight only to be told off by her and later Wolverine.

Later, X-Force tracks the mutant child to Muir Island where it is being guarded by the Acolytes and the Marauders. They manage to hold them off for some time when the rest of the X-Teams arrive. When New X-Men member Pixie teleports Predator X to the island, Cyclops orders X-Force to take it out. Hepzibah is one of the X-Force members to engage Predator X; Predator X sprays her with acid hurting her arm. She is then seen standing around Professor X's body.

Divided We Stand
Archangel goes to San Francisco, California, to meet up with Hepzibah, Warpath, and Iceman. All four are caught in the effects of a citywide illusion created by Martinique Jason, who has used her powers to transform the city into a hippie paradise. Jason sends Hepzibah, now calling herself "Lady Kitten", and the others to confront Cyclops and Emma Frost.

Manifest Destiny
Hepzibah relocates with the X-Men to San Francisco. She is shown infuriated at a telephone machine while on a long-distance call to Warpath (who is in Archangel's ranch in Colorado) as she can't hear him, but the reality is that an angst-ridden Warpath is just remaining silent because even though he still wants to speak to her, he is overcome with guilt and shame for all the killing he has done in the name of mutant survival as a member of Wolverine's version of X-Force.

She has been seen in the background of Utopia, having gone to the Island with the X-Men.

Deportation
When Henry Gyrich is made co-director of S.W.O.R.D., he organizes all aliens living on Earth to be deported. While at a bar in San Francisco, Hepzibah is drugged by undercover S.W.O.R.D. agents and taken away by them. Her disappearance among the X-Men leads Cyclops and Emma Frost to contact Beast and Abigail Brand about why S.W.O.R.D. has taken her away to be deported. Hepzibah and the other aliens help save S.W.O.R.D. from an invasion and depose Gyrich. All of the aliens are returned to their respective homes, with Hepzibah going to stay in Utopia, the new base of the X-Men.

Avengers vs X-Men
An apparently single-again Hepzibah becomes openly flirtatious with other males, going so far as to aggressively proposition Namor for casual sex, even in the company of an amazed Sunspot amidst an impending war between the X-Men and the Avengers over Hope Summers; she later giddily discusses Namor's sexual performance with the Queen of Tabusa Rasa (a previous sexual conquest of Namor turned X-Men ally) even within audible earshot of both Namor and Sunspot.

Marvel NOW!
Hepzibah is seen again much later in space, where she has been reunited with a mysteriously resurrected Corsair, and the two of them are on an extended vacation with the younger time-displaced teenage version of Cyclops from All New X-Men. Scott calls her "his dad's girlfriend who is an alien cat-skunk-person-thing" and also his "almost-stepmother" who is "rather wonderful, honestly". Corsair later reveals to Scott, via flashback, that Hepzibah was responsible for his resurrection by convincing the rest of the Starjammers to take his corpse to an alien planet where he was brought back to life. However the process involved him being converted into a somewhat techno-organic cyborg who must now regularly ingest pills containing nano-machines in order to remain alive.

Powers and abilities
Relative to a human, Hepzibah possesses enhanced agility, speed, reflexes, coordination, balance, hyper-keen senses, and superhumanly acute night vision and sense of smell. Mephitisoids also have retractable claws, and the ability to emit specific mind/mood-altering pheromones at will.

Hepzibah is a brilliant natural athlete and acrobat, and skilled hand-to-hand combatant, trained in various forms of armed and unarmed combat known in the Shi'ar galaxy. She is also an expert marksman, and is knowledgeable in the operation of a wide variety of ship-sized weaponry. She is often armed with Shi'ar energy guns.

Reception
 In 2014, Entertainment Weekly ranked Hepzibah 57th in their "Let's rank every X-Man ever" list.

Appearance
As a member of the Mephitisoid race, Hepzibah's features are supposed to resemble that of a humanoid skunk, with a huge skunk-like tail and fur having the black-and-white coloring pattern of an Earth skunk. However, modern Marvel artists have given her a more cat-like appearance, often making her tail much smaller and making her fur all-white by removing the black markings of her coat altogether. In her modern appearances, Hepzibah's ears are now closer in appearance to those of a skunk as they are now more rounded and on the sides of her head while in her classic appearances, Hepzibah's ears were closer to a cat as they were more pointed and on the top of her head.

In other media
Hepzibah appeared in the "Phoenix Saga" of the X-Men animated series, voiced by an uncredited actress. She appears as a member of the Starjammers. In reference to their relationship in the comics, one scene shows her and Corsair sharing a kiss. She re-appears with the other Starjammers in "Orphan's End".

References

External links
 Hepzibah at Marvel.com
 

Characters created by Chris Claremont
Characters created by Dave Cockrum
Comics characters introduced in 1977
Fictional characters with superhuman senses
Marvel Comics aliens
Marvel Comics characters who can move at superhuman speeds
Marvel Comics extraterrestrial superheroes
Marvel Comics female superheroes
Marvel Comics martial artists
Space pirates